William John Dunstan (13 October 1873 – 13 September 1930) was an Australian politician. He was a Labor member of the Queensland Legislative Council from 1920 to 1922, when the Council was abolished.

References

1873 births
1930 deaths
Members of the Queensland Legislative Council
Australian Labor Party members of the Parliament of Queensland
Burials at Toowong Cemetery